Pudhcha Paaul is an Indian Marathi Soap opera that aired on Star Pravah. It is an official remake of Hindi TV serial Saath Nibhaana Saathiya of StarPlus. It premiered on 2 May 2011 and stopped on 1 July 2017 completing 1944 episodes. It is one of the longest-running Marathi television series and Star Pravah's longest-running serial.

Premises 
Kalyani is a simple naive girl. She married in the Sardeshmukh family where she develops a bitter-sweet relation with her mother-in-law Rajlaxmi, the stern matriarch of the family. Rajlaxmi makes Kalyani dance to her tunes. The story progresses as Rajlaxmi turns mentor to Kalyani.

Plot 
The story revolves around a simple innocent orphaned village girl named Kalyani (Jui Gadkari). She does all the household work yet her aunt Kanchanmala (Supriya Pathare) and cousin Rupali (Sharmila Rajaram Shinde) cannot tolerate her, and torture her daily. She is illiterate and they do not allow her to take any education. One day Rajalaxmi (aka Akkasaheb) Sardeshmukh (Harshada Khanvilkar) comes to their home with his son Soham (Astad Kale) for marriage of Rupali with Soham who already has an affair with another girl. But instead of Rupali she likes Kalyani and decides to make the latter her daughter-in-law, going against the wishes of her son.

Later both Kalyani and Rupali are married to Soham and Rohit (Soham's cousin) (Suyash Tilak) respectively. Rupali is jealous of Kalyani as she failed to become elder daughter-in-law of Sardeshmukh mansion which may deprive her of inheriting the property of the Sardeshmukh family. She, along with the evil plans of her mother Kanchanmala creates problems in Kalyani's life and tries to kill her. With all of these troubles on her shoulder, Kalyani completes all of her duties & wins all other family member's hearts. Later Soham also coming out from his past, falls in love with Kalyani and accepts her as his wife. In all the troubles Rajalaxmi (aka Akkasaheb) supports her as her own daughter making an inherent bond between a mother-in-law and daughter-in-law.

Taking the opportunity of brother's death Soham's ex-girlfriend comes again in Soham and Kalyani's married life to make Kalyani's life hell. She pretends as mentally unstable and innocent Kalyani takes her in Sardeshmukh mansion going against everyone's decision. Soham's ex now makes problems to kick Kalyani out of the house and to bring back Soham again in her life.

Cast 
 Jui Gadkari as Kalyani Sardeshmukh –  Kanchanmala's niece; Rupali's cousin; Soham's ex-wife; Sameer's wife; Karan's mother (2011-2017) 
 Harshada Khanvilkar as Rajlaxmi "Akkasaheb" Sardeshmukh – Jaywantrao's wife; Soham and Sameer's mother; Karan's grandmother (2011-2017) 
 Sangram Samel as Sameer Sardeshmukh – Rajlaxmi and Jaywantrao's younger son; Madhukar's adoptive son; Soham's brother; Kalyani's second husband; Karan's adoptive father (2013-2017)
 Unknown as Karan Sardeshmukh – Kalyani and Soham's son; Sameer's adoptive son (2015–2016) (Dead)
 Sharmila Shinde as Rupali Randive Sardeshmukh – Kanchanmala's daughter; Kalyani's cousin; Rohit's wife; Chakuli's mother (2011-2016) 
 Suyash Tilak / Abhijeet Kelkar as Rohit Sardeshmukh – Devaki and Yashwant's son; Soham and Sameer's cousin; Rupali's husband; Chakuli's father (2011-2016)
 Aastad Kale as Soham Sardeshmukh – Rajlaxmi and Jaywantrao's elder son; Sameer's brother; Kalyani's ex-husband; Swapnali's husband; Karan's father (2011-2015) (Dead)
 Swapnali Patil as Swapnali Sardeshmukh – Soham's widow; Bunty's wife (2014-2016) 
 Radhika Barve / Supriya Pathare as Kanchanmala Randive – Chintamani's sister; Rupali's mother; Kalyani's aunt (2011-2015) 
 Ajinkya Joshi as Chintamani – Kanchanmala's brother; Kalyani and Rupali's uncle (2011-2017) 
 Milind Safai as Jaywantrao Sardeshmukh – Yashwant's brother; Rajlaxmi's husband; Soham and Sameer's father; Karan's grandfather (2011–2016)
 Mrunal Deshpande as Devaki Sardeshmukh – Yashwant's wife; Rohit's mother; Chakuli's grandmother (2011-2017) 
 Shrirang Deshmukh as Yashwant Sardeshmukh – Jaywantrao's brother; Devaki's husband; Rohit's father; Chakuli's grandfather (2011–2017)
 Pradeep Velankar as Dadasaheb Sardeshmukh – Yashwant and Jaywant's father (2011-2017) 
 Sonali Naik as Kaveri Jaywant Sardeshmukh (2011-2013) 
 Tejashree Dharne as Sayali Pradhan (2016-2017) 
 Rashmi Anpat as Aishwarya (2011-2012) 
 Radhika Harshe
 Mrunal Chandrakant
 Atisha Naik

Reception 
Since its inception, it remained one of the top rated Marathi GEC program during its run time. In June 2011, it was the most watched Marathi serial with 3.8 TVR. In week 5 of 2012, it gained 4.1 TVR fetching second position. In week 13 of 2012, it garnered 4.2 TVR maintaining its top position. In May 2012, it garnered 3.9 TVR with gaining second position.

References

External links 
 Pudhcha Paaul at Hotstar
 

Marathi-language television shows
2011 Indian television series debuts
2017 Indian television series endings
Star Pravah original programming